Inhebantu of Busoga is the title given to the queen consort to the ruler of the Kingdom of Busoga – the Kyabazinga of Busoga in Uganda. The most recent Inhebantu was Alice Muloki, who died on November 6, 2005.

References 

Busoga
Ugandan monarchies
Titles of national or ethnic leadership